Jan Willem "Jan-Willem" van Woudenberg (born 16 February 1948) is a retired Dutch rower. He competed at the 1972 Summer Olympics in the coxed fours, together with Evert Kroes, Wim Grothuis, Johan ter Haar and Kees de Korver, and finished in seventh place. His team finished ninth in this event at the 1971 European Championships. His brother Gert Jan van Woudenberg competed in the same event at the 1976 Olympics.

References

1948 births
Living people
Dutch male rowers
Olympic rowers of the Netherlands
Rowers at the 1972 Summer Olympics
People from East Nusa Tenggara